Bishnu Shrestha (born 1975) is a Nepalese–Gurkha soldier in the Indian Army (7th battalion the 8th Gorkha Rifles) and recipient of the Sena Medal for bravery, and the Uttam Jeevan Raksha Padak medal, both awarded for his gallant conduct during an armed train robbery.

Early life
Shrestha was born in Bachchha Deurali Khola, ward no. 9 of Parbat district in the western part of Nepal. He and his family moved to Pokhara after being recruited to an Indian Gurkha regiment.

Train robbery incident

In  September 2010, Bishnu Shrestha, a 35-year-old Gurkha soldier, was on his way to Gorakhpur from Ranchi. He was travelling via the Maurya Express (Hatia-Gorakhpur) when between 30 to 40 armed robbers attacked the train near Chittaranjan, West Bengal and robbed the passengers of their valuables. 

Shrestha was fast asleep when the bandits reached him. Awakened, he was prepared to give up his valuables, but the 18-year-old woman next to him was grabbed by the robbers who intended to rape her. The woman called for help. He pulled out the large, curved khukuri that all Gurkha soldiers carry and attacked the bandits. 

Shrestha told the Times of India, "I am a soldier and get paid to protect citizens of this country. I could not sit back and watch as passengers were looted. I pulled out my khukuri and attacked the criminals. I succeeded in connecting with at least three of them. The blows were severe and they must have got themselves admitted to some hospital. By then, the criminals started fighting back. They fired a shot that missed me. At one point of time, the khukuri fell from my hand and I was overpowered. They picked it up and used it on me." The Times of India continues, "After Shrestha slumped to the ground, profusely bleeding from his wound, all fight went out from the other passengers. None of them dared to make eye contact with the criminals and did their bidding."

Six robbers were arrested and Rs 10,470 in cash, 33 mobile phones, 14 wrist watches and an ATM card were recovered, along with two pistols, live cartridges, and seven daggers. 

Shrestha's injuries to his left arm required two months of medical treatment, but he recovered full use of his injured hand.

Aftermath
Shrestha was pleased by the appreciation he received and thanked the media for covering the news. 

“The Indian media brought the incident to light and the Nepalese media too gave it due importance. I may have even been sent to jail on the charge of robbery had the girl and the Indian media not come forward to my support," Shrestha said. "I was hardly recognized even in Baidam [his neighbourhood]. Now the whole country knows me." 

When the intended rape victim's family offered him a large cash reward, he refused it with the following comment: "Fighting the enemy in battle is my duty as a soldier.  Taking on the thugs on the train was my duty as a human being."

In popular culture
Bollywood Music director, singer, and actor Himesh Reshammiya announced that he would make a biopic on him based upon his heroics of the Maurya Express train robbery. But cast and crew have not been finalised yet.

References

1975 births
Living people
Gurkhas
People from Parbat District
People from Pokhara
Newar people